The canton of Nouvion-sur-Meuse is an administrative division of the Ardennes department, northern France. It was created at the French canton reorganisation which came into effect in March 2015. Its seat is in Nouvion-sur-Meuse.

It consists of the following communes:

Les Ayvelles
Baâlons
Boulzicourt
Bouvellemont
Chagny
Chalandry-Elaire
Champigneul-sur-Vence
Dom-le-Mesnil
Étrépigny
Évigny
Flize
Guignicourt-sur-Vence
Hannogne-Saint-Martin
La Horgne
Mazerny
Mondigny
Montigny-sur-Vence
Nouvion-sur-Meuse
Omicourt
Omont
Poix-Terron
Saint-Marceau
Saint-Pierre-sur-Vence
Sapogne-et-Feuchères
Singly
Touligny
Vendresse
Villers-le-Tilleul
Villers-sur-le-Mont
Vrigne-Meuse
Warnécourt
Yvernaumont

References

Cantons of Ardennes (department)